Jonathan Donald Weeks (born February 17, 1986) is an American football long snapper for the Houston Texans of the National Football League (NFL). He was signed by the Texans as an undrafted free agent in 2010. He played college football at Baylor.

Early years and college career
Jon Weeks attended Mountain Ridge High School in Glendale, Arizona, where he was a four-year letterer for the Mountain Lions football team. Weeks started three consecutive years at offensive line and two at defensive line, where he excelled at both positions while only standing at 5'8. As a senior, Weeks was named to Arizona's all-state offensive line and was also voted as the best defensive lineman in the entire state, additionally winning Arizona's two-way MVP. He also lettered four years in powerlifting. Despite the performance, Weeks’ small size resulted in no D1 offers, and he chose to walk on at Baylor University.

After successfully walking onto Baylor's football team, he briefly practiced at defensive end and middle linebacker before finding a spot as the team's long snapper, where he saw starting playing time as a true freshman. He was placed on full scholarship entering his sophomore season and he would start every long snap for the remainder of his college career, with the exception of four games he missed as a junior due to illness. As a senior, Weeks was voted as Baylor's special teams captain and was considered one of the best long snappers in college football. He additionally tacked on six tackles and a forced fumble throughout his career.

Professional career
Weeks went undrafted in the 2008 NFL Draft and had a tryout with the Detroit Lions in minicamp, but did not sign with them. He was out of football for the 2008 and 2009 seasons. On April 28, 2010, Weeks signed with the Houston Texans and made the team following training camp.

Weeks re-signed with the Texans on March 5, 2012. He signed a four-year, $3.9 million contract extension with the Texans on September 7, 2015.

On January 19, 2016 it was announced that Weeks had been selected to his first Pro Bowl.

On September 9, 2018 in the season opener against the New England Patriots, Weeks set the Houston Texans franchise record for most consecutive games played with 129. The streak continues to this day.

On March 26, 2020, Weeks re-signed with the Texans. He was released during final roster cuts on September 5, 2020, but re-signed with the team two days later.

Weeks re-signed with the Texans again on March 29, 2021, and again on February 22, 2022.

References

External links
Houston Texans bio
Baylor Bears football bio

1986 births
Living people
People from Bethpage, New York
Players of American football from New York (state)
American football long snappers
Baylor Bears football players
Houston Texans players
Unconferenced Pro Bowl players